Bob Hewitt and Frew McMillan were the defending champions but only Frew McMillan competed that year with Bob Carmichael. Bob Carmichael and Frew McMillan lost in the semifinals to John Newcombe and Tom Okker.

John Newcombe and Tom Okker won in the final 6–1, 3–6, 6–3, 5–7, 6–4 against Jimmy Connors and Ilie Năstase.

Seeds

Draw

Finals

Top half

Section 1

Section 2

Bottom half

Section 3

Section 4

References

External links
1973 French Open – Men's draws and results at the International Tennis Federation

Men's Doubles
French Open by year – Men's doubles